Perry Green is a hamlet near the village of Bradwell Juxta Coggeshall, in the Braintree district, in the English county of Essex. For transport there is the A120 road nearby.

References 
A-Z Essex, 2010 edition. p. 15.

Hamlets in Essex
Braintree District